Deeya Suzannah Bajaj (born 9 March 1994) is an Indian adventure sports athlete. She completed climbing the Seven Summits on 5 June 2022.

Biography 
Bajaj is the daughter of Shirly Thomas Bajaj and Ajeet Bajaj (Indian adventurer and Padma Shri awardee). She is a PADI certified rescue diver and has completed an advance course in mountaineering from the Nehru Institute of Mountaineering.

Adventure 
At the age of 17, Bajaj participated in a 550 km long cross country skiing expedition, where she skied across the Greenland Icecap to raise funds for a children's home. She was the youngest in the world at the time to have completed the expedition.

On 16 May 2018 Bajaj and her father became the first Indian father-daughter duo to climb Mount Everest. They are also the first parent-child team to have climbed Everest from the North Side (Tibet). The climb was undertaken to support the cause of the girl child in India. The father-daughter team has climbed all of the Seven Summits including Mount Everest, Denali, Aconcagua, Vinson, Elbrus, Kilimanjaro and Mount Kosciuszko.

Awards 

 Meri Dilli Award in the category "Adventure Sports" 2012
 TiE (The IndUS Entrepreneurs) Aspire Young Achievers Award ‘In appreciation of unrivalled contributions as a role model for the Youth of India’ 2012
 Adventure Tour Operators Association Of India "Adventurer Of the Year" 2013

References

External links 

 TEDx 'The Spirit Of Adventure'
 TEDx 'Beyond Everest'
Website

Indian female mountain climbers
Indian mountain climbers
Indian summiters of Mount Everest
21st-century Indian women
21st-century Indian people
Indian explorers
1994 births
Living people
Cornell University alumni